Mid-term parliamentary elections were held in Cuba on 1 November 1910 in order to fill half the seats in the House of Representatives. The Liberal Party was the biggest winner, taking 23 of the 41 seats. Voter turnout was 68.7%.

Results

References

Cuba
Parliamentary elections in Cuba
1910 in Cuba
November 1910 events
Election and referendum articles with incomplete results